Zsuzsanna Szabó-Olgyai (born 6 May 1973 in Oroszlány) is a retired pole vaulter from Hungary, who represented her native country in the women's pole vault event at the 2000 Summer Olympics in Sydney, Australia.

Competition record

References

1973 births
Living people
Athletes (track and field) at the 2000 Summer Olympics
Hungarian female pole vaulters
Olympic athletes of Hungary
People from Oroszlány
Competitors at the 1997 Summer Universiade
Competitors at the 2001 Summer Universiade
Sportspeople from Komárom-Esztergom County